Subahu (Thai: Sawahu) was a rakshasa character in the Ramayana.

Story

Subahu, Maricha and their mother, Tataka, took immense pleasure in harassing the munis of the jungle, especially Vishvamitra, by disrupting their yajnas with rains of flesh and blood.

Vishvamitra approached Dasharatha for help in getting rid of these pestilences. Dasharatha obliged by sending two of his sons, Rama and Lakshmana, to the forest with Vishvamitra, charging them to protect both the sage and his sacrificial fires.

When Subahu and Maricha again attempted to rain flesh and blood on the sage's yajna, Subahu was killed by Rama. 

Maricha escaped to Lanka. In the fear of Rama, he lived as a sage but was then ordered by Ravana to trick Rama into hunting him down. Maricha refused and tried to persuade Ravana to not do such a dreadful task but Ravana insisted and threatened to kill him. Maricha eventually decided to be killed by Rama since it was honourable to die at the hands of God rather than Ravana. He was eventually killed by Rama when he took the form of a deer.

References

Rakshasa in the Ramayana

Characters_in_the_Ramayana